David Marazzi (born 6 September 1984) is a footballer from Switzerland who currently plays as midfielder for Yverdon Sport in the Swiss Promotion League.

External links

1984 births
Living people
Swiss men's footballers
Swiss Challenge League players
Swiss Super League players
FC Aarau players
FC St. Gallen players
FC Lausanne-Sport players
Servette FC players
FC Le Mont players
Yverdon-Sport FC players
Sportspeople from Lausanne
Association football midfielders